Siddheshwar temple may refer to various temples in India:

 Siddheshwar & Ratneshwar Temple, a temple of Shiva near Latur in Maharashtra
 Siddheshwar temple, Solapur, a temple of Siddheshwar in Maharashtra
 Siddheshwar temple, Toka, a temple of Shiva in Maharashtra
 Siddhesvara Temple, a temple located in Haveri, Karnataka
 Siddheshwar Temple, Hemadpanti, an 11th-century temple in Hottal, Nanded, Maharashtra State

See also
 Siddheshwar, 12th-century mystic and a Kannada poet

Shiva temples in India